A debate exists within the United States government and American society at large over whether the one-cent coin, the penny, should be eliminated as a unit of currency in the United States. The penny costs more to produce than the one cent it is worth, meaning the seigniorage is negativethe government loses money on every penny that is created. Several bills introduced in the U.S. Congress would have ceased production of pennies, but none have been approved. Such bills would leave the five-cent coin, or nickel, as the lowest-value coin minted in the United States.

Other countries have also withdrawn coins no longer worth producing, such as Canada ending production of the Canadian penny in 2012.  The most recent time that the United States withdrew the lowest-value coin from circulation was with the half-cent coin (hay-penny), which was withdrawn in 1857; the 1857 half-cent coin was worth approximately  cents in  dollars.

Legislation 
In 1990, United States Representative Jim Kolbe [R-AZ] introduced the Price Rounding Act of 1989, H.R. 3761, to eliminate the penny in cash transactions, rounding to the nearest nickel. In 2001, Kolbe introduced the Legal Tender Modernization Act of 2001, H.R. 2528, and in 2006, he introduced the Currency Overhaul for an Industrious Nation (C.O.I.N.) Act, H.R. 5818. While the bills received much popular support from the public, all failed to become law.

In 2017, Senator John McCain [R-AZ] and Senator Mike Enzi [R-WY] introduced S. 759, the Currency Optimization, Innovation, and National Savings (C.O.I.N.S.) Act of 2017, that would stop minting of the penny for 10 years and would study the question of whether production could cease thereafter. The bill died at the end of the 115th Congress with no hearings held by the Senate Committee on Banking, Housing, and Urban Affairs.

Arguments for elimination
                              
Production at a loss In 2020, it cost 1.76 cents to mint a penny. Also, the price of the raw materials from which the penny is made exceeds the face value, so there is a risk that coins will be illegally melted down for raw materials.
Thus, it is not worthwhile for most people to deal with a penny. Using a different calculation, Robert Whaples, a professor of economics at Wake Forest University, estimates a  million annual loss. Additionally, Whaples argues that eliminating the penny would coax people into using one dollar coins. The Federal Reserve says that replacing one-dollar bills with one-dollar coins would save an additional  million per year.
Limited utility Pennies are not accepted by any vending machines or by most toll booths, and are generally not accepted in bulk. Economist Greg Mankiw says that "The purpose of the monetary system is to facilitate exchange, but ... the penny no longer serves that purpose." Pennies often drop out of circulation (for example, they are stored in jars in a person's home) and due to their low value are sometimes even discarded by consumers. This contributes to the United States Mint needing to produce more pennies than all other coins combined.
Prices would not be higher Research by Whaples, using data on nearly 200,000 transactions from a multi-state convenience store chain shows that rounding would have virtually no effect. Consumers would gain a tiny amount about ¢ per transaction.
Elimination would not hurt the poor Given that rounding (based on cash transaction totals being rounded up and down to the nearest multiple of five cents) is neutral at the transaction level, and that cash transactions are faster without having to deal with extremely low-value coins, people who disproportionately deal in cash transactions would be helped more by elimination of the penny. To gain consumer favor for reducing the use of the penny it could be legislated (either on a state or federal level) that all cash transactions totals over a nominal amount (say 25 cents) would need to be rounded down to the nearest multiple of five cents. Rounding down cash transaction totals is a win for the merchant too as it encourages cash sales and thereby avoids the electronic payment fee (typically on the order of two percent of the balance). However any savings on this fee must be balanced against the nontrivial costs of handling cash, which is why many merchants encourage electronic payments.
Recent popular support According to a national survey conducted in January 2017 by the polling team of Hart Research Associates and Public Opinion Strategies on behalf of the Dollar Coin Alliance, there is broad support for eliminating the penny. The Hart/POS survey found that 77 percent of voters support suspending production of the penny. When told of the savings made by suspending the penny, support jumped to 84 percent.
Historical precedents There has never been a coin in circulation in the U.S. worth as little as the penny is worth today, although currently other countries have coins with less purchasing power in circulation. Due to inflation, one nickel in 2017 was worth approximately what a penny was worth in 1974. When the United States discontinued the half-cent coin in 1857, it had a -equivalent buying power of about  cents. After 1857, the new smallest coin was the one-cent, which had a -equivalent buying power of  cents. The nickel fell below that value in 1973; the dime (at 10 cents) fell below that value in 1981; the quarter (at 25 cents) fell below that value in 2012.
Zinc toxicity Zinc can cause anemia or gastric ulceration in babies that inadvertently ingest pennies made after 1982. A single penny can kill a pet.
Environmental hazardThe mining of zinc and copper causes toxic pollution and is especially undesirable when considering the valuable metals being used to produce a coin with little utility.
Effort to transport and countApproximately 60 percent of coins minted are pennies and all these pennies (generally over 5 billion annually) must be transported by secure and therefore expensive means from the Mint to banks and then on to stores. Store employees spend valuable time counting low-value pennies at the end of a work shift. Banks often return loose coins on an armored truck to be sorted and wrapped so as to be ready to be given out to a customer. This process costs on the order of 10 cents per roll (a 20 percent charge on a roll of 50 pennies).

Arguments for preservation
Consumers and the economy A research paper commissioned by the zinc lobby and its front group Americans for Common Cents concludes that were the penny to be eliminated, consumers, particularly poor consumers who are more likely to use cash, may pay several dollars more each year if all transactions are rounded up. Canada's elimination of the penny, however, rounds cash transactions both up and down. The paper stated that rather than eliminate the penny, it would make more sense to change the composition of the penny to a cheaper metal than zinc if the costs of zinc do not come down and there continues to be a significant loss per penny. The author of the paper, Raymond Lombra, debated penny elimination with another economist.
Historical popular supportA poll conducted in June 2006 by USA Today/Gallup, found that 55% of the American public considered the penny to be a useful coin, while 43% of those surveyed were in favor of abolishing the coin.
Increased cost Commissioned by Jarden Zinc, which supplies zinc "penny blanks" to the Mint, a report conducted by Navigant Consulting found that the government would lose money without the penny. According to Americans for Common Cents' website, "First, the Mint's fabrication and distribution costs include fixed components that will continue to be incurred whether or not the Mint produces the penny. Second, under current Mint accounting, the nickel costs eleven cents to manufacture.

Nickels
As of 2022, nickels cost  to produce and distribute, providing an argument for elimination similar to the penny's production at a loss. The current face value of a nickel is also well below that which the last remaining lowest-denomination coin (the penny) held at the time of the half-cent's elimination in 1857.

Lobbying
The sole provider of zinc "penny blanks," Jarden Zinc Products of Greeneville, Tennessee, has hired lobbyists to make the case for preserving the penny and their sales.
The coin lobby Citizens to Retire the Penny support the elimination of the United States one-cent coin.
 The Coin Coalition of vending machine manufacturers, arcade owners, and soft drink companies supports eliminating the penny and the paper dollar bill.

Some question was raised about the Obama Administration being particularly opposed to elimination of a coin that depicted another president from Illinois, but the Chicago Tribune ran an editorial in favor of abolition.

Other options
Economist François R. Velde suggested in 2007 that the government make the penny worth five cents. This change would add about $6 billion to the money supply.

Congress passed the Coin Modernization, Oversight, and Continuity Act of 2010, which requires the Treasury to report on possible new metallic coin materials. In the 2014 Biennial Report, Appendix 4, the Mint reported that the previous study had "found that there was no more-cost-effective alternative material for the one-cent", and thus recommended that it continued its current mix of copper and zinc.

Precedents in other countries

Many countries outside the United States have chosen to remove low-value coins from circulation:

Australia discontinued one-cent coins in 1990 and two-cent coins of the Australian dollar in 1989 due to the metal exceeding face value.  They were fully withdrawn from circulation in 1992.
Until 2012, Canada minted a one-cent coin of similar size and color as its American counterpart, with steel as the interior metal instead of zinc, though composition was near identical to US cents prior to 2000 and so it circulates at par in small quantities in the United States (and vice versa). However, on March 29, 2012, the Canadian government announced that it would eliminate the penny from its coinage system. The final Canadian penny was minted on May 4, 2012, and active distribution of the coin by the mint was discontinued on February 4, 2013. Since that date, businesses were encouraged to begin rounding cash transactions only to the nearest five-cent increment. Cheques and transactions using electronic paymentsdebit, credit and payments cardsare not rounded.
Mexico's new peso transition in 1993 made the five-centavo coin the smallest denomination of the new currency. In 2009, new coins were minted only for the 10, 20 and 50 centavo denominations.
New Zealand eliminated one- and two-cent coins of the New Zealand dollar in April 1990, and the five-cent coin in October 2006.
At US military bases overseas, AAFES rounds up or down to the nearest one-twentieth denomination of currency.

However, many nations still use coins of similar or smaller value to the United States cent. In some cases, while the nominal value of the coin may be smaller than that of a US cent, the purchasing power may be higher:
South Korea stopped minting  and  coins, but  coins (worth about ) are still minted with changing composition and used only in supermarkets.
Some countries in the Eurozone use one and two-cent coins. As posted prices generally include taxes, it is possible (but not standard) for vendors to round prices to the nearest five cents and eliminate the need for smaller-value coins. However, Finland, Ireland and the Netherlands have abandoned the use of one- and two-cent coins altogether. Finland only ever produced a small number of one-cent coins, mostly for collecting and legal reasons.
Panama and Ecuador, which use the United States dollar as their currency, mint their own coins including one-centavo pieces identical in size to the penny. However, prices and wages are generally lower in those countries than in the United States.

Laws regarding melting and export
On April 17, 2007, a Department of the Treasury regulation went into effect prohibiting the treatment, melting, or mass export of pennies and nickels. Exceptions were allowed for numismatists, jewelry makers, and normal tourism demands. The reason given was that the price of copper was rising to the point where these coins could be profitably melted for their metal content. In 1969, a similar law regarding silver coinage was repealed. Because their silver content frequently exceeds collector value, silver coins are often sold by multiplying their "face value" times a benchmark price that floats relative to the spot silver price per ounce. According to American law, US citizens are allowed to melt foreign coinage (e.g., Canadian pennies) for personal or commercial use; however, by doing so they are usually violating the laws of the country that issued the coinage in question.

See also

 Debasement
 Gresham's law
 Inflation
 Inflationism
 Inflation hedge
 Metal theft
 Take a penny, leave a penny

Notes

References

Numismatics
Political controversies in the United States